Yaw Asante (born 18 May 1991) is a Ghanaian professional footballer who plays for Italian club Città Castello as a midfielder.

Career
Asante signed for Grosseto before the start of 2009–10 Serie B season, and played for the youth team of Grosseto. Asante made his debut for Grosseto on 20 October 2010 in a 2010–11 Coppa Italia 2–1 defeat to Genoa at the Stadio Luigi Ferraris. He made his Serie B debut for Grosseto on 31 January 2012 in a match against Hellas Verona at the Stadio Marc'Antonio Bentegodi.

On 27 October 2012 he is taken out of the squad from Grosseto Calcio.

Career statistics

References

External links

1991 births
Living people
Ghanaian footballers
Association football midfielders
F.C. Grosseto S.S.D. players
Serie B players
Ghanaian expatriate footballers
Expatriate footballers in Italy
Ghanaian expatriate sportspeople in Italy
Cosenza Calcio players